Hurghada is a city in the Red Sea Governorate of Egypt.

Etymology 
The city's name is derived from the Arabic name of Nitraria plant. The English Hurghada comes from gharqad, a variant of the same name.

The tree is mentioned in a hadith, where it's called "tree of the Jews".

Overview 

Hurghada was founded in the early 20th century. For many decades it was a small fishing village, but it has grown into a major Red Sea resort as a result of Egyptian and foreign investment that began in the 1980s. Holiday resorts and hotels provide facilities for windsurfing, kitesurfing, yachting, scuba diving and snorkeling. The city is known for its watersports, nightlife and warm weather. Hurghada is a popular holiday destination for Europeans, especially during the winter, and some spend Christmas and New Year there. Tourist numbers from Russia dropped significantly after the Metrojet Flight 9268 plane crash in November 2015.

Hurghada extends for about  along the coast, but does not reach far into the surrounding desert. The resort is a destination for Egyptian tourists from Cairo, the Delta and Upper Egypt, as well as package holiday tourists from Europe. Hurghada has a population of 248,000 and is divided into: 
El Ahia and El Helal – the northern part
El Dahar (Downtown) – the old town 
Sakala – the city center
El Kawsar – the modern part
El Mamsha (Village Road) – a pedestrianised street with a length of over 

Many of Hurghada's newer hotels, restaurants, and shops are located along El Mamsha. Most of the newest and largest hotel resorts are located in the area between Mamsha and Sahl Hasheesh on El Mamsha. Beyond Sahl Hasheesh there are the hotels of Makadi Bay. Dahar is the oldest part of the town where the town's traditional bazaar, the post office and the long-distance bus stations (Go Bus and Upper Egypt Bus) are situated. The busiest area is Sakala, the "city center" on Sheraton Road, where there are hotels, shops and restaurants.

The city is served by the Hurghada International Airport with scheduled passenger traffic connecting to Cairo and directly to several cities in Europe. A new terminal was opened in 2015 to accommodate increasing traffic.

History 
The village, which later evolved into what is now the city of Hurghada, was first settled in 1905. Originally Hurghada was a fishing village. Oil was discovered in the area in 1913, and in 1921 British oil companies began its production and export. During the reign of King Farouk a recreational center was built in the city, but after President Nasser's nationalization of Egypt's industries it was reallocated to the Egyptian Armed Forces.

During the War of Attrition between Israel and Egypt (1967–70), Shadwan Island in the Red Sea to the east of the city was fortified by Egyptian troops and used as a radar post. On 22 January 1970 the island was the site of Operation Rhodes, a helicopter assault by Israeli troops who occupied it for 36 hours.

In September 1994, drive-by shooters killed two Egyptians and a German tourist; another German man was wounded in the attack and died of his injuries after returning to Germany.

In 2016, a terrorist attack in Hurghada, inspired by the jihadist group Islamic State, wounded three tourists. In another terrorist attack in Hurghada in 2017, a man declared that he wanted to kill only non-Egyptians, and stabbed seven female tourists. Two German women and one Czech woman were killed in the attack, which took place at two separate resort hotels.

Tourism

Hurghada's major industry is foreign and domestic tourism, owing to its landscape, year-round hot and dry climate and long beaches. Its waters are clear and calm for most of the year and have become popular for water-sports, particularly scuba diving and snorkelling.

There are diving sites around Abu Ramada Island, Fanadir, Giftun Kebir, and Giftun Soraya. Tourists also visit shipwrecks such as the El Mina or the Rosalie Moller. The beach at Hurghada is busy and public, and beyond the town the coast road passes through holiday villages set in the desert.

In a 2016 attack and again in a 2017 attack foreign tourists at Hurghada's beach resorts were targeted by terrorists.

Demographics

Russian residents

Hurghada has 4 schools for Russian children, which are: Constellation, Our Traditions, Dina and The World of Knowledge  (the Russian School Hurghada), as well as the newsletter MK in Egypt. Much of the signage in the city, is in Russian. In June 2015 MK in Egypt publisher Yulia Shevel stated that there were about 20,000 Russians in Hurghada, giving it Egypt's largest Russian population, though only about 3,000 were officially documented.

In 2017, the Russian Consulate was open in Hurghada.

Climate 
Hurghada has a subtropical-desert climate (Köppen climate classification: BWh), with mild-warm winters and hot to very hot summers. Temperatures in the period December–January–February are warm, but in the evenings temperature may drop from an average 20 Celsius degrees to 10. November, March and April are comfortably warm. May and October are hot and the period from June to September is very hot.

Climate Charts shows different averages and cooler day temperatures in summer.

Resorts near Hurghada

Sahl Hasheesh 

El Qoseir 
 
 
El Qoseir is one of the Egyptian gateways, and one of the oldest cities on the western coast of the Red Sea. In the past it was known by various names, such as Thagho in the pharonic period, Leucos Limen (white port in Greek) in the Hellenistic and Ptolemaic period, and Portus Albus in the Roman period. In the Islamic period it was given the name El Qoseir, which means "a small palace or fortress".

Located between Hurghada and Marsa Alam, El Qoseir used to be an important port. Many people traveled from there to the Land of Punt to buy ivory, leather and incense. During the Ottoman  and the Islamic periods, Egyptians and Muslims from North Africa traveled from El Qoseir as pilgrims to Mecca. It was also the only port importing coffee from Yemen. During the French occupation of Egypt, El Qoseir was the arrival point for Arabs and Muslims from Hejaz coming to fight beside the Mamluk against the French army. The most important sites in El Qoseir are the fort and the water reservoir. The water reservoir was El Qoseir's only source of drinking water 100 years ago.

El Qoseir El Adima, the city's historic area, was once a Roman port and hundreds of amphora and old pottery artefacts have been found there. There are several 300-year-old buildings in the area, including an Ottoman fort and a number of historic mosques: El Farran, El Qenawi and El Senousi. The police station is also located at a historic site. The area contains bazaars, cafes, coffee shops and restaurants selling sea food.

Makadi Bay
A tourist resort located 30 km south of Hurghada dedicated only to hotels, shops, and clubs. There are no settlements with locals. The place features good sandy beach.

Sharm El Naga 
A village, around 40 km (25 mi) south of Hurghada. Its beach contains a beautiful reef cliff.

Soma Bay 

Soma Bay A tourist resort situated 45 km (28 mi) south of Hurghada, with various hotels including Palm Royale Soma Bay, La Residence des Cascades, Robinson Club, Sheraton (Kempinski – opening August 2008) & Caribbean World Resort Soma Bay (opened December 7).

El Gouna 

A privately owned luxury hotel town, about 25 km north of Hurghada. Quiet and clean, the town consists of several islands separated by channels and connected by bridges. Besides 14 hotels and 3 marinas, there are also 2200 private villas and apartments, while many more are under construction. It is promoted by some as Egypt's Venice. It is built on 10 km of beachfront and has unique and diverse architecture.

El Gouna provides diving and watersports centers, horse stables, go-karting, shopping arcades, bazaars, a wide selection of restaurants and bars, night clubs, an internet cafe, four bank branches, many automated teller machines (ATMs), two pharmacies, the El Gouna international school, El Gouna national school, a nursery, a private hospital, three marinas, a library, an airport, one of several casinos on the Red Sea coast, a private radio station, a post office, a museum, real estate offices and an 18-hole golf course designed by Gene Bates with a unique aqua driving range.

El Mahmya 
A tourist beachfront camp on the protected Giftun island, 45 minutes by boat from Hurghada.

Education
International schools include:
 German School Hurghada
 Russian School Hurghada
French School of Hurghada

See also

 Marsa Alam
 Red Sea Riviera
 Hurghada International Airport
 List of cities and towns in Egypt

References

External links

Egyptra Travel Guide from Egypt

RedSeaPages - Pulse of the Red Sea 

 
Governorate capitals in Egypt
Populated places established in 1905
Populated places in Red Sea Governorate
Populated coastal places in Egypt
Port cities and towns of the Red Sea
Underwater diving sites in Egypt
Seaside resorts in Egypt
Cities in Egypt
Red Sea Riviera